Menegazzia athrotaxidis is a species of foliose lichen in the family Parmeliaceae. Found in Australia, the species was described as new to science by Australian lichenologist Gintaras Kantvilas in 2012. The type specimen was collected in Mount Field National Park, southeast of Lake Emmett. The specific epithet refers to the genus of its host. The lichen is only known to occur in the highlands of Tasmania, where it mostly grows on conifers.

See also
List of Menegazzia species

References

athrotaxidis
Lichen species
Lichens described in 2012
Lichens of Australia
Taxa named by Gintaras Kantvilas